The Hotel Viking, or The Hotel Viking, in Newport, Rhode Island, is a historic hotel.

It was opened in 1926.  Investors included local businessmen Harry Titus, James O’Connell, and others, plus summer vacationers in the area such as William H. Vanderbilt, who formed "The American Hotels Corporation" to issue public stock and supervise construction during. It was renovated in the mid-1900s (including to add an outdoor pool), in the mid-1990s (including to add a conference center facility), in 2007 (to restore its rooms to "Gilded Age splendor") and again in 2016.

It is a member of the Historic Hotels of America.

It is a five-story Colonial Revival building with, in 2020, 208 rooms or suites.  The facility includes a fine-dining restaurant, a lounge, a seasonal bar & kitchen, and regular afternoon tea service in its Garden Room.

North Shore magazine said in 2021 that the hotel has both historic and modern wings, and "looks great for its age".

It is located on Bellevue Street, a large part of which is included in Bellevue Avenue Historic District, listed on the National Register of Historic Places. The Bellevue Avenue Historic District was listed on the National Register of Historic Places in 1972 and was further designated a U.S. National Historic Landmark District in 1976.  The district includes The Breakers, which is a Vanderbilt family mansion, and numerous other properties of the Gilded Age era, but not the Hotel Viking.

Notes

References

External links
Hotel Viking, official site

Hotels in Rhode Island
Newport, Rhode Island
Buildings and structures in Newport, Rhode Island
Buildings and structures completed in 1926
Historic Hotels of America